Norman Leslie McCleary (14 July 1911 – 21 July 2000) was an Australian rules footballer who played with Essendon in the Victorian Football League (VFL).

Talbot later served in the Australian Army during World War II.

Notes

External links 
		

1911 births
2000 deaths
Australian rules footballers from Victoria (Australia)
Essendon Football Club players